David Papaux (born 27 May 1981, in Fribourg) is a Swiss judoka. He is also active as a lawyer, economist and politician and has a bachelor's degree in informatics from the University of Fribourg.

Achievements

References

davidpapaux.com

1981 births
Living people
People from Fribourg
Swiss male judoka
Judoka at the 2004 Summer Olympics
Olympic judoka of Switzerland
Sportspeople from the canton of Fribourg